The 1967–68 Divizia A was the fiftieth season of Divizia A, the top-level football league of Romania.

Teams

League table

Results

Divizia A play-off
The 13th and 14th-placed teams of the Divizia A faces the 2nd-placed teams from the series of the Divizia B. The play-off tournament was played in Timișoara.

Round 1

Round 2

Round 3

Top goalscorers

Champion squad

See also 

 1967–68 Divizia B

References

Liga I seasons
Romania
1967–68 in Romanian football